The 1970 Tour of the Basque Country was the tenth edition of the Tour of the Basque Country cycle race and was held from 15 April to 19 April 1970. The race started and finished in Eibar. The race was won by Luis Santamarina of the Werner team.

General classification

References

1970
Bas